The Collie Mail was established at Collie, Western Australia in 1908 by Mr H.E. Reading, who had previously established The Southern Times in Bunbury. The paper was published bi-weekly to share the news and information of the new coal mining town of Collie.

The distribution area of the Collie Mail covers Collie, Bunbury, Darkan, Donnybrook and Duranillan.

The Collie Mail is now owned by the Fairfax organisation.

Variant titles

The Collie Mail has had a number of different titles over the years it has been in print:

Availability

Issues (1914 - 1918) of this newspaper have been digitised as part of the Australian Newspapers Digitisation Program, a project of the National Library of Australia in cooperation with the State Library of Western Australia.

Hard copy and microfilm copies of the Collie Mail are also available at the State Library of Western Australia.

See also 
 List of newspapers in Australia
 List of newspapers in Western Australia

References

External links 
 
 

Newspapers established in 1908
Newspapers published in Western Australia
1908 establishments in Australia
Collie, Western Australia
Newspapers on Trove